The Dalle à ammonites (or Dalle aux ammonites) at Digne-les-Bains (Alpes-de-Haute-Provence) is a remarkable natural site consisting of a rock strata bearing a large number of fossilized ammonites. This site is located approximately 1.5 km south of Digne-les-Bains from Barles road. It is part of the Géologique de Haute-Provence National Nature Reserve.

The slab, inclined at 60°, is made of grey limestone. It bears around 1 500 ammonites, 90% of which belonging to the species Coroniceras multicostatum, dating from the Sinemurian (Early Jurassic). Those ammonites can attain a diameter of 70 cm.

Nautiloids, belemnites, Pecten seashells and other bivalves can also be found in the deposit.

The deposit thickness is estimated to be 20 cm, deposited over a 100 000-year period.

Slab history

As well known as it is, the slab wasn't known until recently : Alcide d'Orbigny, who prospected the area in the middle of the XIX century, doesn't mention it. Geologists studying the ichthyosaur remains near the site only mentions numerous species of ammonites and other molluscs.

The dalle is thought to have been partially unearthed for the first time in June 1941, during road works on what is now the D 900A. In 1979, before the establishment of the Géologique de Haute-Provence National Nature Reserve, earthworks began to uncover the slab and unearthed 600 ammonites over 160 m2.

Until 1994 only 200 m2 were visible. After this date, the Géologique de Haute-Provence National Nature Reserve took the task of clearing an additional 150 m2 to attain a total area of 350 m2. 

The 160 m2 already unearthed in 1992 of the slab were molded in 1992 by the geological reserve for the city of Kamaishi in Japan (who desired to buy the original). The mold was realized in 30 parts, which were sent and reassembled in Japan.

Geological aspect

Similar sites

An almost horizontal Ammonoidea slab, from the Triassic or the Jurassic, is located below Fressac bridge over the Conturby river in Gard.

Geodynamic context

The Dalle à ammonites was created during the Alpine orogeny. The Dignes-les-Bains area is located in the French Prealps, in the Dauphinois geological facies. It bears the traces of the oceanisation preceding the orogeny beginning.

The Alps were erected in several phases, after a subduction happened in the paleo-ocean Tethys. The Dalle à ammonites, as well as other sites in the area, are witnesses of the first step of this process, and of what was life in this ocean before the apparition of the mountains. They bring paleontological context for the understanding of paleoenvironments and period conditions.

Paleontological analysis

The fossils aspect helps to understand the sedimentation process. The good conservation of the shells give informations over the marine dynamism responsible for the deposit conditions : an hectic environment, like a beach or a coast, were the waves actions were strongly felt, with a tendency to break the shells, leading to fragmentary deposits, settled as faluns or lumachella. The majority of the fossils on the slab are still almost complete, which lead to the hypothesis of a milder environment, deeper, and better preserved. Moreover, this deposit was effected over the carbonate compensation depth, and hence at an average depth.

The tapophenosis analysis, as well as the position of the shells, lead to the conclusion that the Dalle à ammonites was an accumulation facies : a large number of dead animals were carried by weak marine currents, towards their deposit site. Traces of bioturbation can be attributed to the benthic fauna, such as scavenger worms, who thrived in this biotope.

References

External links
 Réserve géologique de Haute Provence
 Livret-Guide d'excursion géologique, congrès de l'Association des paléontologues français, 3-5 Mai 2007 
 Ammonites:  photographies d'ammonites, un projet artistique d'Oscar Molina

Geography of Alpes-de-Haute-Provence
Tourist attractions in Alpes-de-Haute-Provence
Geologic formations of France
Jurassic Europe
Sinemurian
Fossiliferous stratigraphic units of Europe
Paleontology in France
Alpes-de-Haute-Provence